Emma Anna-Maria Green, also known as Emma Green Tregaro (born 8 December 1984) is a retired Swedish high jumper. She won a bronze medal in the event at the 2005 IAAF World Championships. She represented Sweden at the 2008 and 2012 Summer Olympics. She finished 2nd at the 2010 European Athletics Championships with a new personal best of 2.01 m.

Biography
Emma Green was born in Gothenburg, Sweden, where she lived with mother Maria, father Lennart, and younger brother Erik. She finished gymnasium in 2003, then with a goal to participate in the 2006 European Athletics Championships.

She won the bronze medal in the 2005 World Championships in Athletics, where she got the result 1.96 metres — a new personal best.

On 1 July 2010 Emma Green improved her personal best to 1.98 m when she won at the Sollentuna GP, beating her previous best which had lasted almost five years. Only one month later, on 1 August 2010, at the 2010 European Championships in Barcelona, she improved her personal best  twice over within 5 minutes; first she jumped 1.99 and then just minutes later she jumped 2.01. This was her first time over the two-metre mark and was worth a European silver medal behind Blanka Vlašić – her first continental medal. She won the Folksam Grand Prix in Gothenburg later that month, jumping 1.95 m.

Apart from being a world class high-jumper she has been a Swedish champion at the 100 m, 200m and long jump and is also a top national level triple jumper.

She won a bronze medal in high jump at the 2012 European Athletics Championships in Helsinki on 28 June.

Personal life

In 2011 Green married her coach Yannick Tregaro, who was also the coach of high jumper Kajsa Bergqvist and triple jumper Christian Olsson. The couple announced their divorce in early 2014.

LGBT rights
She is a supporter of LGBT rights and painted her nails in rainbow colors during the 2013 World Championships in Moscow as an act of defiance against Russia's recent ban on gay propaganda.  Yelena Isinbayeva condemned Green Tregaro's action at a press conference, but later clarified her views. The Swedish Olympic Committee subsequently cautioned their athletes against engaging in the same type of manifestation as Green Tregaro's at the upcoming Winter Olympics 2014.

Competition record

Personal bests
 High jump
 Indoor – 1.98 m
 Outdoor – 2.01 m (2010)
 Long jump
 Outdoor – 6.41 m
 Triple jump
 Outdoor 13.16 m
 100 meters
 Outdoor 11.58 seconds
 200 meters
 Outdoor 23.02 seconds
 4 × 100 m
 Outdoor 44.53 seconds

See also
Female two metres club

References

External links

 
 
 www.friidrott.se Results DB
 interview with 20 years old Emma Green at SVT's open archive 

1984 births
Living people
Swedish female high jumpers
Swedish people of Estonian descent
Athletes (track and field) at the 2008 Summer Olympics
Olympic athletes of Sweden
Athletes (track and field) at the 2012 Summer Olympics
World Athletics Championships medalists
European Athletics Championships medalists
Swedish LGBT rights activists
Örgryte IS Friidrott athletes
Athletes from Gothenburg